Jéssica Fernanda da Costa Andrade (born September 25, 1991) is a Brazilian professional mixed martial artist. Andrade is currently signed to the Ultimate Fighting Championship (UFC), where she competes in the women's Flyweight division and is a former UFC Women's Strawweight Champion. As of March 7, 2023, she is #4 in the UFC women's strawweight rankings, #5 in the UFC women's flyweight rankings, and #8 in the UFC women's pound-for-pound rankings.

Background
Andrade was born on September 25, 1991, in Umuarama, Paraná, Brazil, to farmer parents Julio and Neusa Andrade. She is of Native Brazilian descent through her great grandmother. Andrade and her older brother Fernando worked at their parents' plantation fields throughout their childhood until the farm was municipalized, leading to the prohibition of underage labor. At the age of 14, she started working at a fish & pay pond and later delivering medicine for a drug store. Andrade grew up playing soccer and futsal, aspiring to become a professional soccer player. She succeeded well and eventually got offered to play for a São Paulo club, but her parents forbade her from moving. During school, Andrade started training judo and shortly afterward, in 2011, jiu-jitsu.

Her teammates coined the nickname bate estaca (piledriver), a term used in Brazil for body slams (also known as Daki age), after one of her first amateur BJJ competitions, when Andrade was caught in an armlock, she panicked and performed the illegal move on her opponent by lifting her and then slamming her head directly into the mat. To Andrade's surprise, she was immediately disqualified.

Mixed martial arts career

Early career
Andrade made her professional mixed martial arts debut on September 6, 2011. For the first six professional fights, Andrade trained at Gracie Humaita in Umuarama, but after beating Duda Yankovich, she moved to Niterói in order to train at Paraná Vale Tudo. She won eight of her first ten fights in her native Brazil.

On April 14, 2013, Andrade fought outside of Brazil for the first time when she submitted Milana Dudieva at ProFC 47: Russia vs. Europe in Rostov-on-Don, Russia.

Ultimate Fighting Championship
Andrade made her UFC debut against Liz Carmouche, as a replacement for Miesha Tate, at UFC on Fox: Johnson vs. Moraga on July 23, 2013. This marked the first time that two openly gay fighters went head-to-head in the UFC. Andrade lost the fight via TKO in the second round.

Andrade's second UFC appearance took place on October 26, 2013, when she faced Rosi Sexton at UFC Fight Night 30. She won the fight via dominant unanimous decision.

Andrade was expected to face TUF 18 women's winner Julianna Peña at UFC 171. However, Peña pulled out of the bout, after suffering an injury to her right knee, and she was replaced by Raquel Pennington. Andrade won the back-and-forth fight via split decision.

As the first bout of her new four-fight contract, Andrade was expected to face Valérie Létourneau on September 13, 2014, at UFC Fight Night 51. However, Létourneau withdrew due to an injury and Andrade instead faced UFC newcomer Larissa Pacheco. She won the fight via submission in the first round.

Andrade faced Marion Reneau on February 22, 2015, at UFC Fight Night 61. Andrade lost the fight as she was quickly submitted via a triangle choke in the first round.

Andrade faced Sarah Moras on July 15, 2015, at UFC Fight Night: Mir vs. Duffee. She won the fight by unanimous decision.

Andrade made a quick turnaround, as she replaced an injured Liz Carmouche to take on Raquel Pennington at UFC 191. She lost the fight by submission in the second round.

Move to strawweight
In October 2015, Andrade announced her decision to move to the strawweight division. Andrade then faced former title challenger Jessica Penne at her new weight class on June 4, 2016, at UFC 199, winning the one-sided bout via TKO in the second round.

Andrade next faced Joanne Calderwood on September 10, 2016, at UFC 203. She won the fight via submission in the first round.

As the first bout of her new eight-fight contract, Andrade was scheduled to face Maryna Moroz at UFC 207 on 30 December 2016. Nevertheless, Moroz withdrew from the bout citing an injury and Invicta FC Strawweight Champion Angela Hill was briefly linked as a replacement. However, the fight never materialized for that event because of a rule in the UFC's anti-doping policy with USADA. Subsequently, Andrade was removed from that card with the pairing left intact and rescheduled to take place at UFC Fight Night: Bermudez vs. The Korean Zombie on February 4, 2017. Andrade won the fight by unanimous decision. In addition, both participants were awarded Fight of the Night honors.

Title contention and UFC champion 
Andrade faced Joanna Jędrzejczyk for the UFC Women's Strawweight Championship on May 13, 2017, at UFC 211 in Dallas, Texas. She lost the fight via unanimous decision.

Andrade faced Cláudia Gadelha at UFC Fight Night: Saint Preux vs. Okami on September 23, 2017. She won the fight via unanimous decision (30–25, 30–26, and 30–27). This fight earned Andrade her second Fight of the Night bonus award.

Andrade faced Tecia Torres on February 24, 2018, at UFC on Fox 28. She won the fight via unanimous decision.

Andrade faced Karolina Kowalkiewicz on September 8, 2018, at UFC 228. She won the fight via knockout in the first round. This win earned her the Performance of the Night award.

Andrade faced Rose Namajunas on May 11, 2019, for the UFC Women's Strawweight Championship in the main event at UFC 237. She won the fight via knockout (slam) in the second round. This win earned her the Fight of the Night and Performance of the Night award.

In the first defense of her title, Andrade faced Zhang Weili on August 31, 2019, in the main event at UFC on ESPN+ 15. She lost the fight via first-round technical knockout.

Andrade was scheduled to face Rose Namajunas for a rematch on April 18, 2020 at UFC 249. On April 9, 2020,  Namajunas pulled out for undisclosed reasons. Instead the bout was rescheduled and eventually took place on July 12, 2020 at UFC 251. Andrade lost the fight via split decision. This fight earned her the Fight of the Night award.

Flyweight
On the heels of two consecutive losses at strawweight, Andrade fought Katlyn Chookagian in a flyweight bout on October 18, 2020, at UFC Fight Night: Ortega vs. The Korean Zombie.  Andrade defeated Chookagian by technical knockout in the first round to become the first woman in the UFC to win in three different weight divisions (bantamweight, strawweight, and flyweight). This win earned her the Performance of the Night award.

Andrade faced Valentina Shevchenko for the UFC Women's Flyweight Championship on April 24, 2021 at UFC 261. She was dominated throughout the bout and lost in the second round via elbows while in the crucifix position.

Andrade faced Cynthia Calvillo on September 25, 2021 at UFC 266. She won the fight via technical knockout in round one.

Andrade faced Amanda Lemos in a Strawweight bout on April 23, 2022 at UFC Fight Night 205. She won the fight via a standing arm-triangle choke in round one, marking the first time this submission has been landed in UFC history. This win earned her the Performance of the Night award.

Andrade, replacing Katlyn Chookagian, was scheduled to face Manon Fiorot on September 3, 2022, at UFC Fight Night 209. However, Andrade withdrew in mid July due to undisclosed reasons and was replaced by Fiorot's original opponent Chookagian.

Andrade faced Lauren Murphy on January 21, 2023, at UFC 283. She won the fight via unanimous decision.

Andrade faced Erin Blanchfield, replacing Taila Santos on February 18, 2023 at UFC Fight Night 219. Prior to the bout, Andrade signed a new four-fight contract with the organization. She lost the fight via submission in round two.

Return to strawweight 
Andrade is scheduled to face Yan Xiaonan on May 6, 2023, at UFC 288.

Championships and accomplishments
 Ultimate Fighting Championship
 UFC Women's Strawweight Championship (One time; former)
 Tied (with Rose Namajunas & Amanda Lemos) for most finishes in UFC Women's Strawweight division history (5)
 Most knockouts in UFC Women's Strawweight division (3)
Tied (Amanda Nunes) for most wins in UFC Women's history (15)
 Most bouts in UFC Women's history (23)
Most Fight of the Night bonuses in UFC Women's history (4)
Most Post Fight bonuses in UFC Women's history (9)
Tied (Ronda Rousey and Amanda Nunes) for most Performance of the Night bonuses in UFC Women's history (5)
Only woman in UFC history to win a fight in three weight classes
First standing arm-triangle choke finish in UFC History
Second most finishes in UFC Women's history (8)
 Performance of the Night (Five times) 
 Fight of the Night (Four times) 
2022 Submission of the Year 
 MMAJunkie.com
 2017 September Fight of the Month vs. Cláudia Gadelha
 2019 May Fight of the Month vs. Rose Namajunas
 2020 July Fight of the Month vs. Rose Namajunas
 2022 April Submission of the Month vs. Amanda Lemos
Bleacher Report
2022 Submission of the Year

Personal life
Andrade married her longtime girlfriend Fernanda (née Gomes) in 2019.

On May 30, 2019, Andrade and Fernanda were robbed at gunpoint with their car and mobile phones being stolen in Brazil.

Mixed martial arts record

|-
|Loss
|align=center|24–10
|Erin Blanchfield
|Submission (rear-naked choke)
|UFC Fight Night: Andrade vs. Blanchfield
|
|align=center|2
|align=center|1:37
|Las Vegas, Nevada, United States
|
|-
|Win
|align=center|24–9
|Lauren Murphy
|Decision (unanimous) 
|UFC 283
|
|align=center|3
|align=center|5:00
|Rio de Janeiro, Brazil
|
|-
|Win
|align=center|23–9
|Amanda Lemos
|Submission (standing arm-triangle choke)
|UFC Fight Night: Lemos vs. Andrade
|
|align=center|1
|align=center|3:13
|Las Vegas, Nevada, United States
|
|-
|Win
|align=center|22–9
|Cynthia Calvillo
|TKO (punches)
|UFC 266
|
|align=center|1
|align=center|4:54
|Las Vegas, Nevada, United States
|
|-
|Loss
|align=center|21–9
|Valentina Shevchenko
|TKO (elbows)
|UFC 261
|
|align=center|2
|align=center|3:19
|Jacksonville, Florida, United States
||
|-
|Win
|align=center|21–8
|Katlyn Chookagian
|TKO (body punches)
|UFC Fight Night: Ortega vs. The Korean Zombie
|
|align=center|1
|align=center|4:55
|Abu Dhabi, United Arab Emirates
|. 
|-
|Loss
|align=center|20–8
|Rose Namajunas
|Decision (split)
|UFC 251
|
|align=center|3
|align=center|5:00
|Abu Dhabi, United Arab Emirates
|
|-
|Loss
|align=center|20–7
|Zhang Weili
|TKO (knees and punches)
|UFC Fight Night: Andrade vs. Zhang
|
|align=center|1
|align=center|0:42
|Shenzhen, China
|
|-
|Win
|align=center|20–6
|Rose Namajunas
|KO (slam)
|UFC 237
|
|align=center|2
|align=center|2:58
|Rio de Janeiro, Brazil
|
|-
|Win
|align=center|19–6
|Karolina Kowalkiewicz
|KO (punch)
|UFC 228
|
|align=center|1
|align=center|1:58
|Dallas, Texas, United States
|
|-
|Win
|align=center|18–6
|Tecia Torres
|Decision (unanimous)
|UFC on Fox: Emmett vs. Stephens
|
|align=center|3
|align=center|5:00
|Orlando, Florida, United States
|
|-
|Win
|align=center|17–6
|Cláudia Gadelha
|Decision (unanimous)
|UFC Fight Night: Saint Preux vs. Okami
|
|align=center|3
|align=center|5:00
|Saitama, Japan
|
|-
|Loss
|align=center|16–6
|Joanna Jędrzejczyk
|Decision (unanimous)
|UFC 211
|
|align=center|5
|align=center|5:00
|Dallas, Texas, United States
|
|-
|Win
|align=center|16–5
|Angela Hill
|Decision (unanimous)
|UFC Fight Night: Bermudez vs. The Korean Zombie
|
|align=center|3
|align=center|5:00
|Houston, Texas, United States
|
|-
|Win
|align=center|15–5
|Joanne Calderwood
|Submission (guillotine choke)
|UFC 203
|
|align=center|1
|align=center|4:38
|Cleveland, Ohio, United States
|
|-
|Win
|align=center|14–5
| Jessica Penne
| TKO (punches)
| UFC 199
| 
| align=center|2
| align=center|2:56
| Inglewood, California, United States
|
|-
|Loss
|align=center|13–5
| Raquel Pennington
| Submission (rear-naked choke)
| UFC 191
| 
| align=center|2
| align=center|4:58
| Las Vegas, Nevada, United States
|
|-
|Win
|align=center|13–4
| Sarah Moras
| Decision (unanimous)
| UFC Fight Night: Mir vs. Duffee
| 
| align=center|3
| align=center|5:00
| San Diego, California, United States
|
|-
|Loss
|align=center|12–4
|Marion Reneau
|Submission (triangle choke)
|UFC Fight Night: Bigfoot vs. Mir
|
|align=center|1
|align=center|1:54
|Porto Alegre, Brazil
|
|-
|Win
|align=center|12–3
|Larissa Pacheco
|Submission (guillotine choke)
|UFC Fight Night: Bigfoot vs. Arlovski
|
|align=center|1
|align=center|4:33
|Brasília, Brazil
|
|-
|Win
|align=center|11–3
|Raquel Pennington
|Decision (split)
|UFC 171
|
|align=center|3
|align=center|5:00
|Dallas, Texas, United States
|
|-
|Win
|align=center|10–3
|Rosi Sexton
|Decision (unanimous)
|UFC Fight Night: Machida vs. Muñoz
|
|align=center|3
|align=center|5:00
|Manchester, England
|
|-
| Loss
|align=center| 9–3
| Liz Carmouche
| TKO (punches and elbows)
| UFC on Fox: Johnson vs. Moraga
| 
|align=center|2
|align=center|3:57
| Seattle, Washington, United States
|
|-
| Win
|align=center|9–2
| Milana Dudieva
| Submission (guillotine choke)
| ProFC 47: Russia vs. Europe
| 
|align=center|2
|align=center|4:34
| Rostov-on-Don, Russia
| 
|-
| Win
|align=center|8–2
| Luciana Pereira
| Submission (rear-naked choke)
| Web Fight Combat 1
| 
|align=center|2
|align=center|3:35
| Rio de Janeiro, Brazil
|
|-
| Loss
|align=center|7–2
| Jennifer Maia
| Decision (unanimous)
| Samurai FC 9: Water vs. Fire
| 
|align=center|3
|align=center|5:00
| Curitiba, Brazil
|
|-
| Win
|align=center|7–1
| Vanessa Silva
| TKO (punches)
| Heavy Fighting Championship 2
| 
|align=center|1
|align=center|1:15
| Cascavel, Brazil
|
|-
| Win
|align=center|6–1
| Alessandra Silva
| Submission (guillotine choke)
| Strike Combat
| 
|align=center|1
|align=center|3:29
| Foz do Iguaçu, Brazil
|
|-
| Win
|align=center|5–1
| Duda Yankovich
| Submission (guillotine choke)
| Bitetti Combat 12: Oswaldo Paqueta
| 
|align=center|1
|align=center|3:02
| Rio de Janeiro, Brazil
|
|-
| Win
|align=center|4–1
| Juliana Silva
| Submission (guillotine choke)
| Ring of Fire 4: In the Faive
| 
|align=center|1
|align=center|1:14
| Presidente Venceslau, Brazil
|
|-
| Win
|align=center|3–1
| Lilian Correia
| TKO (body punch)
| Heavy Fighting Championship 1
| 
|align=center|2
|align=center|N/A
| Cascavel, Brazil
|
|-
| Loss
|align=center|2–1
| Kinberly Novaes
| TKO (punches and knees)
| Nitrix: Champion Fight 11
| 
|align=center|2
|align=center|2:42
| Joinville, Brazil
|
|-
| Win
|align=center|2–0
| Bruna Fernandes
| TKO (punches)
| Wako Grand Prix 3
| 
|align=center|1
|align=center|2:06
| Avaré, Brazil
|
|-
| Win
|align=center|1–0
| Weidy Borges
| TKO (punches)
| Sagaz Combat
| 
|align=center|2
|align=center|3:40
| Umuarama, Brazil
|
|-

See also
 List of current UFC fighters
 List of female mixed martial artists

References

External links
 
 

1991 births
Living people
People from Umuarama
Sportspeople from Paraná (state)
Lesbian sportswomen
Brazilian LGBT sportspeople
LGBT mixed martial artists
LGBT Brazilian jiu-jitsu practitioners
Brazilian female mixed martial artists
Bantamweight mixed martial artists
Strawweight mixed martial artists
Mixed martial artists utilizing Brazilian jiu-jitsu
Ultimate Fighting Championship champions
Ultimate Fighting Championship female fighters
Brazilian practitioners of Brazilian jiu-jitsu
People awarded a black belt in Brazilian jiu-jitsu
Female Brazilian jiu-jitsu practitioners